Seth Vincent Greenberg (born April 18, 1956) is an American college basketball broadcaster who works as an analyst for ESPN.

Prior to taking the position at ESPN he was a coach for 34 years, the last 22 as a head coach. Greenberg has been the head coach at Long Beach State, the University of South Florida, and Virginia Tech. He was a two-time ACC Coach of the Year.

Early life and college playing career
Seth Greenberg is one of the three sons of Marilyn and Ralph Greenberg of Plainview, New York. Older brother Brad also became a college basketball coach.

After graduating from John F. Kennedy High School in Plainview in 1974, Greenberg attended Fairleigh Dickinson University in New Jersey. Lettering for four years in basketball under coach Al Lobalbo, Greenberg graduated in 1978 with a B.A. in broadcast journalism.

Coaching career

Assistant coach at Columbia, Pittsburgh, Virginia, and the University of Miami (1978–87)
From 1978 to June 1980, Greenberg was an assistant coach at Columbia University under Buddy Mahar. Greenberg later joined Roy Chipman as an assistant coach at the University of Pittsburgh from 1980 to 1983. In that era, Pittsburgh appeared in the NCAA Tournaments of 1981 and 1982. For the 1983–84 season, Greenberg was an assistant on Terry Holland's Virginia team that made the Final Four of the 1984 NCAA tournament. Greenberg later worked as an assistant under Bill Foster at the University of Miami from 1985 to 1987.

Long Beach State associate head coach (1987–90)
In 1987, Greenberg became associate head coach at Long Beach State under Joe Harrington. Long Beach State appeared in the National Invitation Tournaments of 1988 and 1990.

Long Beach State head coach (1990–96)
Long Beach State promoted Greenberg to head coach in 1990. In six seasons with Greenberg as head coach, Long Beach State went 105–70, second behind Jerry Tarkanian for the most wins in the program's history. Postseason appearances during the Greenberg era included the 1992 NIT, 1993 NCAA tournament, and 1995 NCAA tournament.

In the 1992–93 season, Long Beach State also had its first Top 25 ranking in 14 years. On January 25, 1993, Long Beach State upset #1 Kansas 64–49 at Allen Fieldhouse. Long Beach State won the Big West tournament in 1993 and 1995.

While at Long Beach, Greenberg was a mentor of two successful future NBA players, Lucious Harris and Bryon Russell.

South Florida (1996–2003)
Greenberg was head coach at the University of South Florida from 1996 to 2003 and had a 108–100 record there. South Florida became the Conference USA regular season champions in the 1999–00 season and made the NIT after the season. South Florida also made the 2002 NIT.

Virginia Tech (2003–12)
In nine seasons at Virginia Tech, Greenberg attained a 170–123 record. Greenberg's tenure at Virginia Tech began with the school's final season in the Big East Conference before joining the Atlantic Coast Conference in 2004. Following his second season at Virginia Tech that included an appearance in the 2005 NIT,  Greenberg won the ACC Coach of the Year award.

In 2005, he helped donate 2,400 student tickets to the NIT game against Temple. In 2008, he increased the donations to 3000 tickets for students in all three NIT games played in Cassell Coliseum.

During the 2006–07 season, Greenberg led the Hokies to a 22–12 record with signature victories against #5 Duke on the road and #1 North Carolina at home in an eight-day span.  The victories landed the Hokies in the AP Top 25 for the first time in over a decade, and earned their first NCAA tournament appearance since 1996. They received a #5 seed in the West bracket, but fell to Southern Illinois in the second round.

Again in 2007–08, Virginia Tech had over 20 wins. Virginia Tech also made the quarterfinals of the 2008 NIT. Greenberg earned his second ACC Coach of the Year award.

On January 21, 2009 the Hokies defeated #1 Wake Forest, 78–71. Wake Forest was the only remaining undefeated team in the nation at the time. Virginia Tech made each NIT from 2009 to 2011 and had its most successful season under Greenberg in 2009–10 with a 25–9 record.

On February 27, 2011 the Hokies defeated #1 Duke in Cassell Coliseum.

Greenberg's tenure as Virginia Tech's head coach ended in April 2012, when Athletic Director Jim Weaver fired him at a surprise news conference.  Greenberg was "completely blindsided and shocked" by Weaver's decision.  Greenberg was replaced by his former assistant, James Johnson.

Greenberg is Jewish, and volunteered to coach the USA Men's Basketball team at the 19th Maccabiah Games in Israel in July 2013.

Awards 
Greenberg was inducted into The National Jewish Sports Hall of Fame and Museum in 2012, and the Long Beach State Hall of Fame in 2013. In 1996 he was inducted into the Southern California Jewish Sports Hall of Fame.

Broadcasting career
Greenberg is a college basketball analyst for ESPN.

Head coaching record

References

External links
 Virginia Tech profile

1956 births
Living people
21st-century American Jews
American men's basketball coaches
American men's basketball players
Basketball coaches from New York (state)
Basketball players from New York (state)
College basketball announcers in the United States
College men's basketball head coaches in the United States
Columbia Lions men's basketball coaches
Fairleigh Dickinson Knights men's basketball players
Jewish American sportspeople
Jewish men's basketball players
Long Beach State Beach men's basketball coaches
Miami Hurricanes men's basketball coaches
People from Plainview, New York
Pittsburgh Panthers men's basketball coaches
South Florida Bulls men's basketball coaches
Sportspeople from Nassau County, New York
Virginia Cavaliers men's basketball coaches
Virginia Tech Hokies men's basketball coaches